Makamisa (English: After Mass) is an unfinished novel written by Filipino patriot and writer José Rizal. The original manuscript was found by historian Ambeth Ocampo in 1987 while going through a 245-page collection of papers. This draft is written in pure, vernacular Lagueño Tagalog and has no written direct signature or date of inscription.

The novel has only one chapter. It runs for only ten pages and is hand-written in the old orthographic ancillary glyphs. Although written in a different language, its style, characterization and setting mirror those of Rizal's two previous works, Noli me tangere and El filibusterismo which he wrote in Spanish.
The chapter ends with a short unfinished sentence:

which in English is equivalent to:

which therefore satisfies the theory of it being unfinished. The novel explores the mysterious ill-temperament of the town curate, Padre Agaton.
Rizal later restarted work on Makamisa, using Spanish. However, the novel remained unfinished. The draft in Spanish was later translated to Filipino (under the name Etikang Tagalog: Ang Ikatlong Nobela ni Rizal) by Nilo S. Ocampo, of the University of the Philippines Diliman College of Arts and Letters.

Characters
Seven characters are mentioned in this 10-page unfinished novel:
 Padre Agaton (Father Agaton) - the parochial curate of the fictitious town of Tulig, described as a cheerful, approachable and powerful man who loves the town and is not known for his bad temper. In the story, he has a sudden, unexpected display of anger, the reason for which is yet to be revealed.
 Kapitan Lucas (Town captain Lucas) - the gobernadorcillo of Tulig and is in danger of losing his government position if he does not please Padre Agaton on the upcoming Easter fiesta.
 Aleng Anday (Miss Anday) - female friend of Padre Agaton and  the only person whom the curate loves. She is an extremely disciplined woman whom everybody admires for her generosity.
 Marcela - Manila-raised daughter of Kapitan Lucas, who returned to Tulig for her aunt's funeral.
 Tenyente Tato (Lieutenant Tato) - lieutenant-general of the guardia civil.
 Don Segundo - the Juez de paz or peace officer of the town.
 Kapitan Tibo - next-in-line to the gobernadorcillo office.

References

Unfinished novels
Works by José Rizal